Cabeço Gordo (Portuguese for "fat mound") is the highest point in the island of Faial, measuring  above sea level. Located on the southern rim of the Caldeira Volcano, on a clear day, most of the islands of the central group of the Azores are visible: Pico, São Jorge, and Graciosa, although normally the caldera may be covered in clouds and fog.

References

Geography of the Azores
One-thousanders of Portugal
Faial Island